The A7 Medium Tank was a British experimental medium tank design of the period between the two World Wars.

The A7 was designed under the Chief Superintendent of Design at the Royal Ordnance Factory, Woolwich who built three prototypes between 1929 and 1937. The A7 never went into production as all prototypes proved mechanically unreliable.

See also
Medium Mark III - another British medium tank under development at the same time

Notes

References

Medium tanks of the United Kingdom
Interwar tanks of the United Kingdom
Abandoned military projects of the United Kingdom